South Alabama is the various parts of southern Alabama. Although it is not a strictly defined geographic region, it generally includes all Alabama counties south of the Black Belt. In that view, South Alabama consists of just the two counties that border the Gulf of Mexico and Mobile Bay: Baldwin County and Mobile County. That area is characterized by extensive wetlands, but also by long, sandy beaches which are very conducive to tourism. Many deluxe golf courses have been developed in the area in recent decades.

Because Mobile and Baldwin Counties tend to use "South Alabama" with such exclusivity, other parts of southern Alabama, particularly the Florida-border counties from Escambia County over to Houston County often humorously prefer to be called Lower Alabama if a regional name must be given. Traditionally the south central and southeastern parts of the state have less in common with the Mobile area than they have in common with southwest Georgia and the Black Belt region.  Alternative names include South Central Alabama, Southeast Alabama, and the Wiregrass.

External links
South Alabama Community Website

Regions of Alabama